Music Academy (before 1992 – Soviet Music) is the oldest Russian peer-reviewed academic journal about music.

History
Soviet Music was established in February 1933 by the Union of Soviet Composers and the Soviet Ministry of Culture. In the first year, the journal was a bimonthly publication 200 pages in length, but after that until World War II the journal was published once a month and was on average 110 pages long.

In 1979, the circulation of the magazine was 21,000 copies. In Soviet times, the journal published articles devoted to the works of domestic and foreign composers, the problems of music science, the development of national and ethnic musical cultures, heritage and education, and questions of the performer skills. The journal also contained various discussion materials, reviews of the concerts and theater premieres, book and music editions, and a chronicle of Soviet and foreign musical life.

Dmitry Kabalevsky was editor-in-chief of Soviet Music from 1940 to 1946.

In 1992, the name of journal was changed to Music Academy with new publishers: the Union of Composers of Russia, the Russian Ministry of Culture, and Compozitor Publishing House.

Editors-in-chief
The following persons are or have been editors-in-chief:
Nikolai Chelyapov (1933–1937)
Moses Greenberg (1937–1939)
Dmitry Kabalevsky (1940–1946)
Alexander Nikolaev (1947)
Marian Koval (1948–1952)
Georgy Hubov (1952–1957)
Yuri Keldysh (1957–1961)
Elena Grosheva (1961–1970)
Yuri Korev (1970–2012)
Marina Voinova (2012–2018)
Yaroslav Timofeev (from 2018)

References

External links

Music theory journals
Contemporary classical music journals
Publications established in 1933
Russian-language journals
Soviet music